Caleb Smith Bragg (23 November 1885  – 24 October 1943) was an American racecar driver, speedboat racer, aviation pioneer, and automotive inventor. He participated in the 1911, 1913 and 1914 Indianapolis 500. In speedboat racing, Caleb won three consecutive APBA Challenge Cup races in Detroit from 1923-1925. He was a co-inventor of the Bragg-Kliesrath brake.

Early life 
Bragg was born on November 23, 1885 in Cincinnati, Ohio to Cais C. Bragg and Eugenia Hofer who were wealthy.

Education 
While at Yale University he became interested in automobile racing.  Bragg graduated from Yale in 1908 and took a post-graduate engineering course at Massachusetts Institute of Technology in 1909.

Career 
On October 5, 1912 Bragg driving a 14 liter F.I.A.T. S74 took 1st place at the 1912 American Grand Prize race, the seventh and final race of the 1912 Grand Prix season. It was held at the Wauwatosa Road Race Course in Milwaukee, Wisconsin and was sanctioned by the Automobile Club of America. Caleb Bragg won by over 15 minutes over Erwin Bergdoll and his 9.5 liter 37/90 hp Benz. Bragg's average speed was 68.397 mph (110.074 km/h).

During World War I he became interested in flying airplanes and in 1916 he flew his first solo flight; he later set airplane records for speed and altitude.

Bragg developed a braking system with Victor William Kliesrath called the Bragg-Kliesrath brake. They formed a company in 1920 and Ethel Merman was his personal secretary before she became famous. They sold the company to Bendix Corporation in the late 1920s.

In speedboat racing, Caleb won three consecutive APBA Challenge Cup races in Detroit from 1923-1925, in 1923 with Packard Chriscraft and the 1924-1925 races with Baby Bootlegger, the 29-foot mahogany wooden speedboat designed for him in 1924 by George Crouch and built by Henry Nevins.

Personal life 
Bragg died on 24 October 1943 in New York City, New York.

Indy 500 results

Gallery

References

1885 births
1943 deaths
American motorboat racers
APBA Challenge Cup
Indianapolis 500 drivers
Indianapolis 500 polesitters
H1 Unlimited
Members of the Early Birds of Aviation
Racing drivers from Ohio
Sportspeople from Cincinnati
Yale University alumni
MIT School of Engineering alumni
American aviation record holders